Maa Neella Tank is an Indian Telugu-language comedy-drama streaming television series directed by Lakshmi Soujanya and produced by Praveen Kolla. It stars Sushanth, Priya Anand, and Sudharshan. Maa Neella Tank premiered on ZEE5 on 15 July 2022.

Synopsis 
Sarpanch Kodandam's son Gopal, a Buchivolu villager, threatens to jump from a water tank in order to marry Surekha. Kodandam is concerned about his career and image, so he appoints SI Valmshi to search for Surekha.

Cast 
 Sushanth as S.I Vamsi
 Priya Anand as Surekha
 Sudharshan as Gopal
 Prem Sagar as Sarpanch Kodandam, father of Gopal
 Nirosha as Chamundi, wife of Kodandam; mother of Gopal
 Ramaraju as Narasimham
 Divi Vadthya as Ramya, sister of Surekha
 Vasu Inturi as Murthy
 Darbha Appaji Ambarisha as Ramana, father of Surekha
 Annapurna as Boonemma
 Bindu Chandramouli as Bhargavi, mother of Surekha
 Sandeep Varanasi as Subbu
 Lavanya Reddy as Revathy
 Sara as Saritha
 Subba Rao as Purohithudu
 Mithra as Shiva
 Appu as Rangadu
 Naresh as Seenu

Episodes

Reception 
Sangeetha Devi Dundoo of The Hindu opined that the series "could have been a lot more fun" further writing "Maa Neella Tank is an eight-episode series that feels at least two or three episodes longer. When things take a turn in the last two episodes and the story heads to its logical conclusion, it is too little and too late to sustain interest." The Times of India gave a rating of 2.5 out of 5 and stated that "While the series had all the ingredients of a potential satirical comedy, too many episodes, recurring themes, and lack of action in some episodes make it a missed opportunity – it needed a more precise and engaging script".

References 

Indian web series

External Links 
 
 Maa Neella Tank  at ZEE5
Telugu-language web series
2022 web series debuts
2022 web series endings
Indian comedy web series
Indian drama web series
Indian crime drama television series
ZEE5 original programming
Telugu-language television shows